Haven't We Met Before? is a 2002 mystery film starring Nicollette Sheridan, Page Fletcher, Anthony Lemke and Daniela Amavia. It was directed by René Bonnière and written by Mary Higgins Clark and John Rutter.

External links

2002 television films
2002 films
American television films
2000s mystery films
American mystery films
Films based on American novels
2000s American films